The Edmonton Flying Club, home of the Edmonton Flight College, is a flying club and flight school located just west of Edmonton, Alberta, Canada. It operates from Parkland Airport in Parkland County. It was founded in 1927 as the Edmonton and Northern Alberta Aero Club. The club's first president was Canadian World War I flying ace, Wilfrid R. "Wop" May. At the time, the purpose of the club was to promote aviation and to provide flight training. Today, the Edmonton Flying Club is a member-owned organization that operates a diverse fleet of aircraft and provides flight training at all levels.

Courses offered
The Edmonton Flying Club offers courses for the following licenses and ratings:

Recreational Pilot Permit
Private Pilot License
Commercial Pilot License
Night Rating
Instrument Flight Rules Rating
VFR Over The Top Rating
Single and Multi Engine Instrument Rating
Multi Engine Instrument Rating
Instructor Rating

Fleet
As of June1, 2016 Edmonton Flying Club has six aircraft listed at their web site and seven registered with Transport Canada:

In addition, the EFC has a state-of-the-art Modular Flight Deck simulator.

Notable pilots associated with EFC
 Carl Agar, learned to fly at the Edmonton Aero Club and was awarded the Air Force Cross for outstanding contributions as a flight instructor during World War II
 Maurice "Moss" Burbidge, pioneering Canadian aviator, taught Agar to fly

References

External links
Edmonton Flying Club
Edmonton Airports

Flying clubs
Aviation in Edmonton